David Frank Malachowski (January 16, 1955 – September 29, 2022) was an American guitarist, producer, composer, singer, musical director and journalist who resided in Manhattan, NY. He had been a member of Reckless (1978–1981), The Greg Austin Band (1985–1988), Commander Cody & His Lost Planet Airmen (1996–1999), Savoy Brown (2000–2005), Mechanical Bull (2007–2009), and sideman for Janie Fricke (1988), Shania Twain (1995–2007), Garth Hudson (2003), Phoebe Legere (2006), Genya Ravan (2012), Anthony Rapp (2010) and Daphne Rubin-Vega (2014–2022) as well as being involved in musical theatre, writing for newspapers and magazines, producing and writing songs.

Career
Malachowski attended Berklee College of Music for one year. Leaving college, he started his career in 1974 in Boston replacing Walter Egan in the band Dangerfish. In 1977, he co-founded rock band Reckless, touring the east coast and recording one LP on Slippery Records.
Malachowski then moved to Lexington, Kentucky to join the Greg Austin Band recording one album, 'Somewhere In Kentucky' in 1987. Governor Martha Layne Collins commissioned Malachowski a Kentucky Colonel in 1996. He left in 1988 to play on the Saddle the Wind Tour with CBS artist Janie Fricke, his first national tour and played Fan Fair (CMA Fest) also in 1988.
In April 1995, after answering an ad in Metroland in Albany, Malachowski became bandleader / guitarist for Shania Twain for 2 years of television performances, promotional shows and Fan Fair (CMA Fest).  In 1997 he joined Commander Cody & His Lost Planet Airmen touring the states, in 1999 became a member of Savoy Brown, touring and recording Strange Dreams (Blind Pig Records) and You Should Have Been There (Panache) as well as appearing on leader Kim Simmonds’ solo CD Blues Like Midnight.
In 2005 he performed with the British Blues Allstars at the San Francisco Blues Festival, members included Long John Baldry, Rod Price, Kim Simmonds and Bob Hall. David left Savoy Brown at the end of 2005, and performed with Ernie Williams, Peter Karp, Jill Stevenson, Mechanical Bull and Phoebe Legere.

In 2007, Malachowski was asked to play the Lake George Blues Blast, and assembled a band featuring, organist Pete Levin and harp player Dennis Gruenling along with drummer Harvey Sorgen, guitarist Albert Cummings and singer Jill Stevenson. The following year Malachowski, Levin and Gruenling reunited bringing in bassist Graham Maby, drummer Gary Burke, singer Machan Taylor, violinist Lorenza Ponce and pianist Daniel A Weiss. Revolving members include Tony Levin, Jerry Marotta, Mike Vicseglia, Marshall Crenshaw, Jerry Velez, Stacey Wilde, Greg Haymes and Ira Coleman.

In 2009 Malachowski released the Secret Life Of Colonel David in which he produced sang, played guitar, bass, piano, drums and composed 4 of the 5 songs. In 2012 his song “I’m Goin’ Down To Newberg” was used in Indy film Fairhaven.
In 2010 David performed in Anthony Rapp’s musical 'Without You' at NYMF, then began concert tours with Rapp and Adam Pascal internationally. Without You was mounted again in 2012 in Boston, Edinburgh, London and Toronto. A cast recording was done in September 2012 at Angel Recording Studios in London. Adam Pascal & Anthony Rapp continue to tour.

As of 2018, Malachowski was a member of Pavlov's Dog, performing lead guitar on the new album "Prodigal Dreamer" and touring with the band on their fall European tour, which opened with two dates at the Wildey Theater in Edwardsville, Illinois, on October 26-27, 2018.

Malachowski died September 29, 2022.

Recording credits
1980 Reckless - Reckless (Slippery Records); guitar, vocals
1987 Somewhere In Kentucky - Greg Austin Band; guitar, vocals, composer
1994 Mountain Snow and Mistle Two - Bridget Ball & Christopher Shaw; guitar
1998 Living On Ritalin - Greg Kroll; guitar, vocals, composer
2000 Blues Like Midnight - Kim Simmonds (Blue Wave Records), guitar
2002 Flying High Professor - Louie & the Crowmatix (Woodstock Records); guitar
2003 Strange Dreams - Savoy Brown (Blind Pig); guitar, vocals
2005 You Should Have Been There - Savoy Brown (Panache); guitar, vocals
2006 Center - Karen Ellick;  producer, guitar, bass, vocals
2007 Midnight Legere - Pheobe Legere (Bennett Records); guitar
2007 Shadows and Cracks - Peter Karp (Blind Pig Records;) guitar, producer
2007 A Million Yesterdays - Mechanical Bull (WMW Records); guitar, vocals
2008 We Are One - Michael Falzarono (Woodstock Records); guitar
2009 Too Much Of A Good Thing - Savoy Brown (Blue Wave Records); guitar, vocals
2010 The Secret Life of Colonel David - David Malachowski (dfm Records); guitar, bass, piano, drums, vocals, producer
2010 Moni P - Moni P; producer, guitar, vocals
2012 Cheesecake Girl - Genya Ravan (Collectables); guitar, composer
2012 Without You - Cast Recording (PC Classics Records); guitar
2014 - Daphne Rubin-Vega
2018 Prodigal Dreamer - Pavlov's Dog (Rockville Music); guitar

References

Bibliography and other sources

External links
David Malachowski official website
Allstars
EPK
 

1955 births
2022 deaths
People from Schenectady, New York
Berklee College of Music alumni
Guitarists from New York (state)
American male guitarists
Savoy Brown members
20th-century American guitarists
20th-century American male musicians